Karleuša is a surname. Notable people with the surname include:

Jelena Karleuša (born 1978), Serbian singer and media personality
 (born 1980), Serbian singer

Serbian surnames